Ahmed Isaiah (born 10 October 1995) is a Nigerian professional footballer who plays for Azerbaijani club Kapaz.

Career

Club
On 4 July 2022, Isaiah left Zira.

References

Living people
1995 births
Association football midfielders
Nigerian footballers
Nigerian expatriate footballers
G.D. Ribeirão players
AD Oliveirense players
Vilaverdense F.C. players
Gil Vicente F.C. players
Varzim S.C. players
S.C. Covilhã players
Zira FK players
Kapaz PFK players
Primeira Liga players
Liga Portugal 2 players
Azerbaijan Premier League players
Campeonato de Portugal (league) players
Expatriate footballers in Portugal
Expatriate footballers in Azerbaijan
Nigerian expatriate sportspeople in Portugal
Nigerian expatriate sportspeople in Azerbaijan